Tom Gorman was the defending champion but withdrew due to an ankle injury sustained playing in the Vienna Open.

Arthur Ashe won the title, defeating Tom Okker 6–2, 6–2 in the final.

Seeds

  Björn Borg (semifinals) 
  Guillermo Vilas (semifinals)
  Tom Okker (final)
  Arthur Ashe (champion)
  Marty Riessen (quarterfinals)
  Jan Kodeš (third round)
  Manuel Orantes (quarterfinals)
  Tom Gorman (withdrew)
  Harold Solomon (third round)
  Eddie Dibbs (second round)
  Raúl Ramírez (quarterfinals)
  Jaime Fillol (third round)
 N/A
  Brian Gottfried (third round)
  Vijay Amritraj (third round)
  Juan Gisbert Sr. (quarterfinals)

Draw

Finals

Top half

Section 1

Section 2

Bottom half

Section 3

Section 4

References
 General
 Main draw
 Specific

Stockholm Open
1974 Grand Prix (tennis)